Crampton Hodnet is a comic novel by Barbara Pym, published posthumously in 1985, and originally written in 1940.

Plot summary
The action takes place over the course of a year in North Oxford, some time before World War II. Miss Doggett likes to entertain students and young clergy at her gloomy Victorian home in Banbury Road. When the new unmarried curate, Mr. Latimer, comes to lodge at her house, he strikes up a friendship with her paid companion, the homely Jessie Morrow, through whose eyes much of the action is seen. He begins to see Jessie as a potential wife and proposes to her, but she rejects him, knowing that his interest in her is practical rather than romantic. 

Miss Doggett's nephew, the don Francis Cleveland, a reader at the (fictitious) Randolph College of Oxford University, falls in love with one of his students, Barbara Bird. He contemplates an extramarital affair with Barbara, but two of Miss Doggett's student protégés see them together, and the word soon reaches acquaintances of Francis's wife, Margaret. 

Francis's daughter, Anthea, is in love with Simon Beddoes, the son of Lady Beddoes, and Miss Doggett is especially keen for the relationship to progress to marriage.

After Margaret finds out about Francis's relationship with Barbara, she leaves for a trip to London. Francis offers to take Barbara for a weekend in Paris but they only get as far as Dover, where Barbara gets cold feet and goes to stay with a friend, leaving Francis to return alone to Oxford, where Margaret forgives him. Simon breaks up with Anthea by letter; she soon begins dating again. Mr Latimer becomes engaged while on holiday, and makes preparations to leave his role as curate. As the new academic year dawns, Miss Morrow acknowledges that she will probably remain unmarried and that nothing ever really changes.

The title of the book is the name of a fictitious village called Crampton Hodnet, which Mr. Latimer invents as an off-the-cuff excuse when asked where he has been, as he does not wish to admit he has been out for a walk with Miss Morrow instead of attending church. "Crampton" was the author's middle name, an old family name on her father's side.

Publication history
Pym commenced writing the novel in 1939. She had not yet been published, but had written at least two novels – Some Tame Gazelle and Civil to Strangers  already. By April 1940, Pym had finished Crampton Hodnet and sent it to close friends for their comments. The outbreak of World War II distracted Pym from her budding literary career, as she served in both England and Naples during the War. She made some alterations to the text in the early 1950s, after her first novel Some Tame Gazelle had been published by Jonathan Cape, but ultimately decided the text was too dated to publish. With the novel unpublished, Pym re-used the characters of Miss Doggett and Jessie Morrow in her 1953 novel Jane and Prudence and in the short story So, Some Tempestuous Morn which was later collected in the volume Civil to Strangers (1987).

After Pym's death in 1980, her literary executors resolved to release unpublished material. Crampton Hodnet was revised by Pym's close friend and executor Hazel Holt and published in 1985 by Macmillan in England and E. P. Dutton in the United States. Pym had described this early novel as "as good as anything I ever did". However, by the time she was in a position to publish it, she felt it was too dated.

Crampton Hodnet was released as an audiobook in the 1980s by Chivers Press read by Angela Pleasence. It was adapted by Elizabeth Proud for BBC Radio in 1992. The novel was published in Germany in 1994 as Tee und blauer Samt (Tea and Blue Velvet).

Reception and analysis
When first published in 1985, The New York Times acknowledged that "the disparate parts of this novel do not quite mesh into the seamless wonder of later works" but was largely positive. The Christian Science Monitor found the book "as brilliant as ever". Kirkus Reviews also reviewed the book positively, noting that the book's "datedness", having been published 45 years after it was written, "provides much of its charm". A. N. Wilson, writing in The Literary Review, was approving of the novel, complimenting especially the "rich period details", however James Fenton writing in The Times felt that Pym was a "minor talent" and that the comparisons of her writing to Jane Austen were overstated. Fenton argued that "she is obsessed with surfaces... I doubt that the novel will give that much comfort. It is too unsatisfactory".

Criticism of the book has examined the way in which Pym's early novel "represents nostalgia for the safety of the Victorian age", and that the novel's North Oxford setting has undertones of the 19th century. Crampton Hodnet has been seen as "both a romantic comedy and a laughing satire on the conventions of romantic comedy", with Pym utilising the tropes of the genre and also questioning them. The novel has been seen as a "companion novel" to Pym's Excellent Women "because of its continued focus on the plight of the spinster". The novel connects to Pym's other works in the realisation by characters that "relationships ... are always better in imagination than in actuality". The novel features some of Pym's common tropes, including intertextual use of quotes from English poetry, women being treated dismissively by men, and male characters who are exaggeratedly silly. Pym also uses clothing and alcoholic drinks as symbols to help clarify characters' social positions, as when Miss Morrow obsesses over a green dress she has been keeping for a special occasion even though it is inappropriate for her station in life, when Miss Doggett drinks sherry or Francis Cleveland takes a bottle of Niersteiner Glöck wine on a seductive picnic. Charles Burkhart, who questioned whether the novel should have been released, said that it was a strong draft but became "the weakest of the eleven published novels" upon publication, said that nevertheless it displayed Pym's great theme: "the involved versus the uninvolved life".

Pym scholar Yvonne Cocking has argued that the character of Simon Beddoes was based on British politician Julian Amery, with whom Pym had a brief romance.

References

Fictional populated places in England
1985 British novels
Novels by Barbara Pym
Novels published posthumously
Novels set in Oxford
Macmillan Publishers books